Ethan Frome is a 1993 British-American romantic historical drama film directed by John Madden, and starring Liam Neeson, Patricia Arquette, Joan Allen and Tate Donovan. It is an adaptation of the 1911 novel Ethan Frome by Edith Wharton.

Plot
Reverend Smith has arrived in Starkfield from Boston. He notices that Ethan Frome is isolated. Smith encourages his parishioners to be charitable.

Ethan and Zeena Pierce are distant cousins. After marrying Zeena, Ethan falls in love with Mattie Silver.

Cast
 Liam Neeson – Ethan Frome
 Patricia Arquette – Mattie Silver
 Joan Allen – Zenobia "Zeena" Frome
 Tate Donovan – Reverend Smith
 Stephen Mendillo – Ned Hale
 Phil Garran – Mr. Howe
 Virginia Smith – Mrs. Howe
 Annie Nessen – Sarah Anne Howe
 Katharine Houghton – Mrs. Hale
 George Woodard – Troll Powell
 Jay Goede – Denis Eady

Release

Reception
Ethan Frome received mixed reviews from critics. On Rotten Tomatoes, the film holds a rating of 54% from 13 reviews.

Home Media
The film was released on DVD by Echo Bridge Entertainment on October 11, 2011. The film debuted on Blu-ray on September 11, 2012 in a double feature with Ruby Cairo (2012). Neither film has any extras on the disc.

References

Further reading
 Tibbetts, John C., and James M. Welsh, eds. The Encyclopedia of Novels Into Film (2nd ed. 2005) pp 119–120.

External links

1993 films
1993 drama films
British drama films
American drama films
Films based on American novels
Films based on works by Edith Wharton
Films set in Massachusetts
Films directed by John Madden
Films scored by Rachel Portman
1993 directorial debut films
1990s English-language films
1990s American films
1990s British films
Films about disability